Jørgen Jensen (2 June 1939 – 12 March 1995) was a Danish wrestler. He competed at the 1960 Summer Olympics and the 1964 Summer Olympics.

References

External links
 

1939 births
1995 deaths
Danish male sport wrestlers
Olympic wrestlers of Denmark
Wrestlers at the 1960 Summer Olympics
Wrestlers at the 1964 Summer Olympics
Sportspeople from Copenhagen